Bang Rakam is a district (amphoe) in the western part of Phitsanulok province, central Thailand.

History
The district was established on 10 December 1905, then named Chum Saeng (ชุมแสง) District. Khun Phadet Prachadun was the first district head officer. Later King Rama VI ordered the district name to be changed to be the same as the central tambon, thus the district name was changed to Bang Rakam on 24 April 1917.

Geography
Neighboring districts are (from the north clockwise), Phrom Phiram, Mueang Phitsanulok, and Bang Krathum of Phitsanulok Province; Sam Ngam and Wachirabarami  of Phichit province; Lan Krabue of Kamphaeng Phet province; Khiri Mat and Kong Krailat of Sukhothai province.

The district's chief water resources are the Yom River, and the secondary Khlong Bang Kaeo and Khlong Grung Grak. Bang Rakam lies within the Yom Basin, although the district's eastern border with Mueang Phitsanulok district is essentially the boundary between the Yom Basin and the Nan Basin. The distinction between the basins is blurry in this region, as the terrain is flat, and residents have diverted much of the water flow for agriculture over the years.  Both basins are part of the Chao Phraya Watershed.

Administration
The district is divided into 11 sub-districts (tambons), which are further subdivided into 135 villages (mubans). Bang Rakam and Plak Raet are townships (thesaban tambons), covering parts of the same-named tambons. There are a further 11 tambon administrative organizations (TAO).

Significant settlements
Of the numerous villages in Bang Rakam District, those that occupy multiple mubans are as follows:
Ban Rai
Ban Plak Raet
Ban Phan Sao
Ban Khlong Grap Phuang

Flooding
During the rainy season of 2006, 24,400 Bang Rakam residents were affected by flooding, including 1,122 residents who contracted conjunctivitis. In late-September 2006, Princess Siribha Chudhabhorn sent trucks of food from the Princess Pa Foundation to assist 11 of the district's villages. In 2006, there were also reported cases of leptospirosis among residents of Bang Rakam, contracted due to the amount of standing water.

Geology
The Thung Yai oil field is in Bang Rakam.

References

External links
amphoe.com (Thai)

Bang Rakam